{{Infobox Political post
|post            = President
|body            = Malta President ta' Malta
|Flag            = Flag of Malta.svg
|insignia        = Flag of the President of Malta.svgborder
|insigniasize    = 150px
|insigniacaption = Presidential Standard
|image           = Επίσκεψη ΥΠΕΞ Ν. Δένδια στη Μάλτα - Συνάντηση με Πρόεδρο Μάλτας George Vella (10.10.2022) (cropped).jpg
|incumbent       = George Vella
|incumbentsince  = 4 April 2019
|style           = His Excellency
|residence       = San Anton Palace
|appointer       = House of Representatives
|termlength      = Five years
|formation       = 
|succession      = Line of succession
|inaugural       = Sir Anthony Mamo
|salary          = €68,936 annually
|website         = https://president.gov.mt/
}}

The president of Malta is the constitutional head of state of Malta. The President is indirectly elected by the House of Representatives of Malta, which appoints the president for a five-year term and requires them to swear an oath to "preserve, protect and defend" the Constitution. The President of Malta also resides directly or indirectly in all three branches of the state. They are part of Parliament and responsible for the appointment of the judiciary.  Executive authority is nominally vested in the President, but is in practice exercised by the Prime Minister.

Establishment of office
The office of the President of Malta came into being on 13 December 1974, when Malta became a republic within the Commonwealth of Nations. Queen Elizabeth II ceased to be head of state and Queen of Malta, and the last Governor-General, Sir Anthony Mamo, became the first President of Malta.

Qualifications

A person shall not be qualified to be appointed President if:

 They are not a citizen of Malta;
 They hold or have held the office of Chief Justice or other Judge of the Superior Courts;
 They are not eligible for appointment to or to act in any public office in accordance with articles 109, 118 and 120 of the Constitution.

Assumption of office
Before assuming office the nominee must take the oath of office before the House of Representatives of Malta.

The oath reads: I, (name of nominee), solemnly swear/affirm that I will faithfully execute the office of President (perform the functions of the President) of Malta, and will, to the best of my ability preserve, protect and defend the Constitution of Malta. (So help me God).Temporary vacancy

Whenever the office of President is temporarily vacant; until a new President is appointed; and whenever the holder of the office is absent from Malta, on vacation, or is for any reason unable to perform the functions conferred upon them by the Constitution, those functions are performed by an individual appointed by the Prime Minister, after consultation with the Leader of the Opposition. If such individual has not yet been appointed, the Speaker of the House of Representatives performs the duties of the President.

Role of the President

Among the powers of the President:

 The President promulgates laws.
 The President may dissolve the House of Representatives of Malta acting on the request of the Prime Minister of Malta or following the passage of a no confidence motion in the Government.
 The President names the Prime Minister with the President making his or her decision based on the situation within the Maltese parliament.
 The President names most members of constitutional bodies (with the assent of the Prime Minister).
 The President receives foreign ambassadors.
 The President may grant a pardon (but not an amnesty) to convicted criminals; the president can also lessen or suppress criminal sentences, acting on the advice of Cabinet or the Minister delegated by Cabinet with such responsibility.
 The President is ex officio Chairman of the Commission for the Administration of Justice of Malta.
 The President is ex officio Head of the Maltese Honours.
 The President is ex officio  Chairman of the Malta Community Chest Fund, a charitable non-governmental institution aimed to help philanthropic institutions and individuals. The President’s spouse is the Deputy Chairperson.
 The President authorises recognition in Malta of honours, awards and decorations. No title of nobility, honour, award, decoration, membership or office may be used in Malta unless it is authorised by the President. The names of those persons so authorized are published in the Government Gazette.

The role of the President is detailed in a publication (in Maltese) called Il-Manwal tal-President tar-Repubblika'' written by former President Ugo Mifsud Bonnici.

Official residences

The official office of the president is the Grandmaster's Palace in Valletta. Other presidential residences include:

 San Anton Palace at Attard – official residence.
 Verdala Palace at Buskett – summer residence.

President's flag

The Presidents of Malta used the national flag as their presidential standard prior to 12 December 1998, when a proclamation established the Presidential Flag of Malta. The flag is flown on the President's official residences and offices and on all occasions at which they are present.

Termination of appointment

The office of President shall become vacant:
 If the President resigns his/her office;
 On the expiration of five years from the date of the appointment to that office;
 If the holder of the office is removed from office by Resolution of not less than two-thirds of the House of Representatives of Malta on the ground of inability to perform the functions of their office (whether arising from infirmity of body or mind or any other cause) or misbehaviour;
 If the President dies in office.

List of presidents

See also
Prime Minister of Malta
List of heads of state of Malta

References

External links
Official Website
Maltese Honours System

Government of Malta
 
1974 establishments in Malta